R.A.E.C. Mons may refer to one of two Belgian football clubs:
R.A.E.C. Mons (1910), the club which used this name between 1934 and its dissolution in 2015
R.A.E.C. Mons (2015), the club which has used this name since 2020.